The Commissioners Waters, a watercourse that is part of the Macleay River catchment, is located in the Northern Tablelands region of New South Wales, Australia.

Course and features 
Commissioners Waters was formed by the confluence of the Dumaresq Creek and Tilbuster Ponds. The river flows generally to the southeast by south, joined by a minor tributary, before reaching its confluence with the Gara River. The river descends  over its  course.

The river is traversed by the Waterfall Way, and is named in honour of Commissioner McDonald, the first Commissioner of Crown Lands in Armidale.

See also

 Rivers of New South Wales
 List of rivers of New South Wales (A-K)
 List of rivers of Australia

References

External links
 
 Northern Rivers Geology Blog - Macleay River

 

Rivers of New South Wales
New England (New South Wales)
Northern Tablelands
Armidale Regional Council